The Jaffe profile (or Jaffe model) is a mathematical function that is used to describe the distribution of mass or light in elliptical galaxies and the bulges of spiral galaxies. It was proposed by Walter Jaffe in 1983.  Its usefulness derives from the fact that it accurately reproduces a de Vaucouleurs profile when projected onto the sky.

The density in the Jaffe model is given by

Jaffe described how he arrived at his model:

Variations on Jaffe's law include the Hernquist profile, the Dehnen profile and the NFW profile, which have a similar functional form as Jaffe's law but which use different values for the two exponents.

References

Astrophysics